New Pine Creek is a census-designated place and unincorporated community in Lake County, Oregon, United States. As of the 2010 census, it had a population of 120. it has a post office with a ZIP code 97635. New Pine Creek lies on U.S. Route 395 at the Oregon–California border, just north of New Pine Creek, California, and east of Goose Lake.

West of town is the Goose Lake State Recreation Area, along Stateline Road near the lake. The north–south running Lake County Railroad passes near the recreation area. East of town is the Fremont National Forest.

Thought to be Lake County's oldest settlement, New Pine Creek was originally to be named "Pine Creek" after a nearby stream. However, since another community was already using that name, postal authorities preferred an alternative. The New Pine Creek post office opened in 1876. S. A. Hamersley was the first postmaster. 

New Pine Creek is the southernmost settlement in the state of Oregon, accepted as part of the state despite being south of the 42nd parallel boundary line nominally separating Oregon from California. This line was set as the boundary between what were then Oregon Country and New Spain by the Adams–Onís Treaty (effective 1821), and maintained when Oregon and California were admitted as states. However, a surveying error in 1868 caused part of New Pine Creek to be placed in Oregon. Delegations from California and Oregon held talks on the issue in 1984 after the error was discovered, but did not ultimately change New Pine Creek's status.

Climate
This region experiences warm (but not hot) and dry summers, with no average monthly temperatures above . According to the Köppen Climate Classification system, New Pine Creek has a warm-summer Mediterranean climate, abbreviated "Csb" on climate maps.

References

Unincorporated communities in Lake County, Oregon
Census-designated places in Oregon
Census-designated places in Lake County, Oregon
Unincorporated communities in Oregon